Saint Stephen's Day, also called the Feast of Saint Stephen, is a Christian saint's day to commemorate Saint Stephen, the first Christian martyr or protomartyr, celebrated on 26 December in Western Christianity  and 27 December in Eastern Christianity. The Eastern Orthodox churches that adhere to the Julian calendar mark Saint Stephen's Day on 27 December according to that calendar, which places it on 9 January of the Gregorian calendar used in secular contexts. In Latin Christian denominations, Saint Stephen's Day marks the second day of Christmastide.

It is an official public holiday in Alsace-Moselle, Austria, the Balearic Islands, Bosnia and Herzegovina, Catalonia, Croatia, the Czech Republic, Denmark, Estonia, Finland, Germany, Greece, Hungary, Ireland, Italy, Luxembourg, Montenegro, North Macedonia, Norway, Poland, Romania, Serbia, Slovakia, Slovenia, Sweden, Ukraine,  Switzerland and Newfoundland. The date is also a public holiday in those countries that celebrate Boxing Day on the day in addition to or instead of Saint Stephen's Day, such as Australia, Canada, New Zealand, South Africa and the United Kingdom.

History

Saint Stephen's Day is the second day of Christmastide and is celebrated in honour of one of the first Christian martyrs, Saint Stephen, who was stoned to death in 36 AD.

Celebrations by country

Ireland

In Ireland, the day is one of nine official public holidays. Its name is sometimes shortened to "Stephen's Day", particularly in informal contexts.

When used in this context, "wren" is often pronounced "ran". This name alludes to several legends, including those found in Irish mythology, linking episodes in the life of Jesus to the wren. People dress up in old clothes, wear straw hats and travel from door to door with fake wrens (previously real wrens were killed) and they dance, sing and play music. This tradition is less common than it was a couple of generations ago. Depending on which region of the country, they are called "wrenboys" and mummers. A Mummer's Festival is held at this time every year in the village of New Inn, County Galway, and Dingle in County Kerry. Mumming is also a big tradition in County Fermanagh in Ulster. Saint Stephen's Day is a popular day for visiting family members and going to the theatre to see a pantomime.

In most of Ulster in the north of Ireland, the day is usually known as Boxing Day, especially in Northern Ireland and County Donegal (chiefly in East Donegal and Inishowen).

Wales
One ancient Welsh custom, discontinued in the 19th century, included bleeding of livestock and "holming" by beating with holly branches of late risers and female servants. The ceremony reputedly brought good luck.

Catalonia, Balearic Islands, Valencian Country (Spain)
Saint Stephen's Day on 26 December is a holiday in Catalonia. It is traditionally celebrated with a festive meal that includes . In Catalan-speaking territories the day is also known as the Second Christmas Day or the Festa Mitjana. In the Valencia area a tradition is to eat with the mother's side of the family on the 25th of December, and on the 26th with the father’s side. Historically, the Catalan holiday on the day after Christmas may be related to the practical need for time to return home after a Christmas Day gathering and may date back to the days of the Carolingian Empire. Although this lacks historical evidence and may be construed as revisionism.

Italy
In Italy, Saint Stephen's Day became a public holiday in 1947, where previously it was a normal working day; the Catholic Church also celebrates it as a religious holiday, even if not as a precept, as it is in Germany and other German-speaking countries. The reason for the public holiday in Italy, not required by the Catholic Church despite the fame of the saint, is to be found in the intention of prolonging the Christmas holiday, creating two consecutive public holidays, which also happens in the case of Easter Monday, a non-religious holiday, but which only wants to lengthen Easter. Before 1947 the two days were working days, with banks and offices open.

Alsace and Moselle
Saint Stephen's Day is marked as a public holiday as part of its shared culture across the Rhine River with Germany.

Austria, Germany, The Netherlands, Czech Republic, Slovakia and Poland
 is a public holiday in mainly Catholic Austria. In the Archdiocese of Vienna, the day of patron saint Saint Stephen is even celebrated on the feast of the Holy Family. Similar to the adjacent regions of Bavaria, numerous ancient customs still continued to this day, such as ceremonial horseback rides and blessing of horses, or the "stoning" drinking rite celebrated by young men after attending Mass.

The 26th of December is – as Second Day of Christmas  – a public holiday in Poland, Germany, The Netherlands and the Czech Republic.

Republika Srpska
Saint Stephen is also the patron saint of Republika Srpska, one of two entities of Bosnia and Herzegovina. St. Stephen's Day, 9 January, is celebrated as the Day of the Republika Srpska or Dan Republike, though mainly as an anniversary of the 1992 events rather than as a religious feast.

Finland
The best-known tradition linked to the Stephen's Day is "the ride of Stephen's Day" which refers to a sleigh ride with horses. These merry rides along village streets were seen in contrast to the silent and pious mood of the preceding Christmas days.

Another old tradition was parades with singers and people dressed in Christmas suits. At some areas these parades were related to checking forthcoming brides. Stephen's Day used to be a popular day for weddings as well. These days a related tradition is dances of Stephen's Day which are held in several restaurants and dance halls.

Bulgaria
In Bulgaria, the Orthodox Church celebrates Saint Stephen's Day, also called Stefanov Den, on the third day after Christmas - December 27. On this day, the ones who have a nameday are given gifts.

See also

 Boxing Day
 Good King Wenceslas
 Saint Stephen's Day bandy
 Wren Day

References

External links

 Saint Stephen's Day at IrishFestivals.net

Christmastide
December observances
January observances
Public holidays in the Republic of Ireland
Public holidays in Croatia
Stephen